USS Reaper is a name used more than once by the United States Navy:

 , a coastal minesweeper placed in service 14 November 1942.
 , a fleet minesweeper commissioned 10 November 1954.

References 

United States Navy ship names